WKRP-LP, or 101.9 WKRP, is a community low power FM ("LPFM") radio station operating in Raleigh, North Carolina.

Capital Area Team Sports, Inc. was granted a construction permit by the Federal Communications Commission to build an LPFM on March 18, 2014.

The station's broadcast radius encompasses the area between  Interstate 440 and Interstate 540 in northeast Raleigh.

See also
List of community radio stations in the United States

References

External links
Official WKRP Website
 

KRP-LP
KRP-LP
Community radio stations in the United States
Radio stations established in 2015
2015 establishments in North Carolina